Câmpia Libertății (The Field of Liberty) is located in the city of Blaj, in Transylvania, Romania. It was the place where two national assemblies were held during the 1848 Revolution, the first one in May, and the second one in September.

The  was held here on May 15, 1848, with the participation of some 30–40,000 people.

A sculptural-monumental ensemble rises on the field, composed of a central monument called the "Glory" and 26 busts depicting the heads of the 1848 Revolution and remarkable figures of Romanian culture.

On June 2, 2019, seven Greek-Catholic Romanian bishops who were martyred under the communist regime (Vasile Aftenie, Ioan Bălan, Tit Liviu Chinezu, Valeriu Traian Frențiu, Iuliu Hossu, Alexandru Rusu, and Ioan Suciu) were beatified by Pope Francis on this field.

Notes

Buildings and structures in Alba County
1848 in Romania
Monuments and memorials in Romania
Tourist attractions in Alba County
Blaj